Lestelle-Bétharram is a commune in the Pyrénées-Atlantiques department in south-western France.

History
In 1832, St. Michel Garicoits established the Society of Priests of the Sacred Heart of Betharram.

On 5 July 1940, Carl Einstein, German author, activist, and art critic, committed suicide here. An anarchist veteran of the Spanish Civil War, he had been interned in France after the rebel Nationalist victory. Although he had escaped in the turmoil following the German invasion of France, he chose death as the solution to an impossible situation.

See also
Communes of the Pyrénées-Atlantiques department

References

Communes of Pyrénées-Atlantiques